Plaza Kvinna (meaning Plaza Woman in English) is a Swedish language monthly women's magazine published in Stockholm, Sweden.

Profile
Plaza Kvinna was established in 1994. The publisher of the magazine is Plaza Publishing Group. The magazine targets professional women who are at the age of 20-45 and most likely live in a big city. Its headquarters is in Stockholm and it is published on a monthly basis.

In 1999 Plaza Kvinna sold 13,000 copies. Its circulation was 28,800 copies in 2013.

See also
 List of magazines in Sweden

References

1994 establishments in Sweden
Magazines established in 1994
Magazines published in Stockholm
Monthly magazines published in Sweden
Swedish-language magazines
Women's magazines published in Sweden
Women's fashion magazines